Fujinon is a brand of optical lenses made by Fuji Photo Film Co., Ltd, now known as Fujifilm.  Fujifilm's Fujinon lenses have been used by professional photographers and broadcast stations as well as cinematography.  Fujifilm started manufacture of optical glass in its Odawara Factory in Japan in 1940, which was the start of the Fujinon brand.  They were proud of their use of expensive Platinum crucibles to get the purest glass achievable at the time.  Fujifilm also pioneered Electron Beam Coating (EBC) which according to Fujifilm, represented a new high in lens precision and performance.  The EBC process was significantly different from other coating processes by the number of coating, the thinness of the coating, and the materials used for coating.  Fujifilm claimed they were able to have as much as 14 layers of coating and used materials such as zirconium oxide, and cerium fluoride, which could not be used for coating in the conventional coating process.  The first lens to offer the Electron Beam Coating was the EBC Fujinon 55mm F3.5 Macro in 1972.  Light transmission for the coating was said to be 99.8%.  EBC later evolved into Super-EBC and HT-EBC (High Transmittance-Electron Beam Coating).

35mm format lenses

 Fujica X bayonet
Fujinon M42 screw mount
 EBC Fujinon Fish Eye 16mm F2.8 
 EBC Fujinon-SW 19mm F3.5
 EBC Fujinon-SW 24mm F2.8
 EBC Fujinon-SW 28mm F3.5
 Fujinon-SW 28mm F3.5
 EBC Fujinon-W 35mm F1.9
 EBC Fujinon-W 35mm F2.8
 Fujinon-W 35mm F2.8
 Fujinon-W 35mm F3.5
 EBC Fujinon 50mm F1.4
 Fujinon 50mm F1.4
 Fujinon 55mm F1.6
 EBC Fujinon 55mm F1.8
 Fujinon 55mm F1.8
 Fujinon 55mm F2.2
 EBC Fujinon Macro 55mm F3.5 
 EBC Fujinon-SF 85mm F4 (Soft Focus)
 EBC Fujinon-T 100mm F2.8
 Fujinon-T 100mm F2.8
 EBC Fujinon-T 135mm F2.5
 EBC Fujinon-T 135mm F3.5
 Fujinon-T 135mm F3.5
 EBC Fujinon-T 200mm F4.5
 EBC Fujinon-T 400mm F4.5
 EBC Fujinon-T 600mm F5.6
 EBC Fujinon-T 1000mm F8
 Fujinon-Z 29-47mm F3.5-4.2
 Fujinon-Z 43-75mm F3.5-4.5
 Fujinon-Z 75-150mm F4.5
 EBC Fujinon-Z 54-270mm F4.5
 EBC Fujinon-Z 75-205mm F3.8

Lenses for the digital Fujifilm X system
 Fujifilm XF Lenses

Fujinon XF Prime 
 XF14mm F2.8 R
 XF16mm F1.4 R WR
 XF16mm F2.8 R WR
 XF18mm F2.0 R
 XF23mm F1.4 R 
 XF23mm F2.0 R WR
 XF27mm F2.8 Pancake
 XF35mm F1.4 R
 XF35mm F2.0 R WR
 XF50mm F2.0 R WR
 XF56mm F1.2 R
 XF56mm F1.2 R APD
 XF60mm F2.4 R Macro
 XF80mm F2.8 R LM OIS WR Macro
 XF90mm F2.0 R LM WR
 XF200mm F2 R LM OIS WR
Fujinon XF Zoom 
 XF8-16mm F2.8 R LM WR
 XF10-24mm F4 R OIS
 XF16-55mm F2.8 R LM WR
 XF16-80mm F4 R OIS WR
 XF18-55mm F2.8-4.0 R LM OIS
 XF18-135mm F3.5-5.6 R LM OIS WR
 XF50-140mm F2.8 R LM OIS WR
 XF55-200mm F3.5-4.8 R LM OIS
 XF100-400mm F4.5-5.6 R LM OIS WR
 XF1.4x TC WR
 XF2.0x TC WR
Fujinon XC Zoom 
 XC15-45mm F3.5-5.6 PZ
 XC16-50mm F3.5-5.6 OIS
 XC16-50mm F3.5-5.6 OIS II
 XC50-230mm F4.5-6.7 OIS
 XC50-230mm F4.5-6.7 OIS II
Fujinon MKX cinema lenses
 MKX 18-55mm T2.9
 MKX 50-135mm T2.9

Lenses for the digital medium format Fujifilm GFX system

Lenses equipped with the Fujifilm G-mount 

Fujinon GF Prime
 GF 23mm F4 R LM WR
 GF 45mm F2.8 R WR
 GF 50mm F3.5 R LM WR
 GF 63mm F2.8 R WR
 GF 110mm F2 R LM WR
 GF 120mm F4 LM OIS WR Macro
 GF 250mm F4 R LM OIS WR
Fujinon GF Zoom
 GF 32-64mm F4 R LM WR
 GF 100-200mm F5.6 R LM OIS WR

Large format lenses
Fujinon SWD is the wide-angle Fujinon line. These lenses are 8 elements in 6 groups, and have an angle of view of 105°.
 65mm 1:5.6 (for 4×5 in)
 75mm 1:5.6
 90mm 1:5.6 (for 5×7 in)

Fujinon SW is a 6-element, 6-group line, with an angle of view of 100°.
 90mm 1:8.0 (for 4×5 in)
 105mm 1:8.0 (for 5×7 in)
 120mm 1:8.0
 125mm 1:8.0

Fujinon-W
 125mm 1:5.6
 135mm 1:5.6
 150mm 1:5.6
 150mm 1:6.3
 210mm 1:5.6
 250mm 1:6.3
 250mm 1:6.7

Fujinon CM-W
 105mm 1:5.6 (for 4×5 in)
 125mm 1:5.6
 135mm 1:5.6
 150mm 1:5.6 (for 5×7 in)
 180mm 1:5.6
 210mm 1:5.6
 250mm 1:6.3
 300mm 1:5.6 (for 8×10 in)
 360mm 1:6.5 (for 11×14 in)
 450mm 1:8.0

Fujinon A lenses are 6 elements in 4 groups, and have an angle of view of 70°. Some of them are multicoated with Fuji's multicoating, EBC (Electron Beam Coating).
 180mm 1:9.0 (for 5×7 in). Image circle at : 252mm
 240mm 1:9.0 (for 8×10 in). Image circle at : 336mm
 300mm 1:9.0 (for 8×10 in). Image circle at : 420mm
 360mm 1:10.0 (for 8×10 in). Image circle at : 504mm

Fujinon C is a line of 4-element, 4-group compact lenses.
 300mm 1:8.5 (for 8×10 in)
 450mm 1:12.5 (for 11×14 in)
 600mm 1:11.5 (for 14×17 in)

Fujinon-L
 210mm 1:5.6
 300mm 1:5.6 . Image circle : 343mm
 420mm 1:8.0

Fujinon T is a 5-element, 5-group line of telephoto designs.
 300mm 1:8.0 (for 4×5 in)
 400mm 1:8.0 (for 5×7 in)
 600mm 1:12.0

Fujinon T EBC for 35mm
 400mm f4.5

Soft Focus is a line of 3-element, 3-group soft focus lenses.
 180mm 1:5.6
 250mm 1:5.6

Medium format lenses
Fujinon GX (M) are lenses for the Fuji GX680 series of cameras.
 50mm/1:5.6
 65mm/1:5.6
 80mm/1:5.6
 100mm/1:4.0
 115mm/1:3.2
 125mm/1:3.2
 125mm/1:5.6
 135mm/1:5.6
 135mm/1:4.0
 150mm/1:4.5
 180mm/1:5.6
 180mm/1:3.2
 210mm/1:5.6
 250mm/1:5.6
 300mm/1:6.3
 500mm/1:8.0
 190mm/1:8.0 Softfocus
 100-200mm/1:5.6 Zoom

Fujinon lenses for the Fuji GX617 camera
 90mm
 105mm
 180mm
 300mm

Enlarging lenses
Fujinar-E
 50mm 1:4.5
 75mm 1:4.5
 105mm 1:4.5

Fujinon-ES is a 4-element line, using a Tessar design.
 75mm 1:4.5
 90mm 1:4.5
 135mm 1:4.5

Fujinon-EP are high-quality enlarging lenses with 6 elements in 4 groups
 38mm 1:4.5
 50mm 1:3.5
 75mm 1:5.6
 90mm 1:5.6
 135mm 1:5.6

Fujinon-EX Some consist of 6 elements in 4 groups, some are 6 elements is 6 groups (Fuji's brochure advertised theme this way: "Because our air-spaced element design increases the number of air-to-glass surfaces, thereby increasing corner sharpness and image quality over cemented element designs".) All with Fuji's EBC multicoating (Electron Beam Coating)
 50mm 1:2.8, flange mounting screws: 39　P=1/26"
 75mm 1:4.5, flange mounting screws: 39　P=1/26"
 90mm 1:5.6, flange mounting screws: 39　P=1/26"
 105mm 1:5.6, flange mounting screws: 39　P=1/26"
 135mm 1:5.6, flange mounting screws: 53　P=0.75

C-Mount lenses 
"Fujinon-TV" CCTV Lenses: Manual Fixed for 1" sensors  

 8mm       1:1.8    CF8A 
 12.5mm  1:1.4    CF12.5A
 25mm     1:0.85  CF25L
 25mm     1:1.4    CF25B
 50mm     1:0.7    CF50L
 50mm     1:1.4    CF50B
 75mm     1:1.8    CF75A

Binoculars
 Mariner XL Series
 Nautilus Series
 Poseidon Series
 Polaris Series
 Techno-Stabi
 Stabiscope

See also
Nikkor
Rokkor
Takumar
Zuiko
Yashinon
Yashikor

References

External links
 Fujinon website

Photographic lenses by brand
Fujifilm lenses
Japanese brands